Florencio Harmodio Arosemena Guillén (17 September 1872, Panama City – 30 August 1945, Manhattan) was the 6th President of Panama from October 1, 1928 to January 3, 1931. He belonged to the Liberal Party.

Biography
He was born in Panama, September 17, 1872, son of Florencio Arosemena De Alba and of Clara Guillén.

At the early age of 11, he was sent to study first in Germany, where his father sent him by considering him of an upper intelligence.  Arosemena was an accomplished civil engineer who graduated from the University of Heidelberg, Germany in 1895.

He spoke seven languages (Spanish, English, German, Turkish, French, Italian, and Portuguese) and was a lifelong friend of physicist Albert Einstein, with whom he had attended university in Germany. It was in Germany his great friendship with Albert Einstein started, one that lasted their lifetime.  
He worked with the German Government in the construction of various railroads in countries such as Portugal Turkey.  Later Cuba hired it for the construction of its Central Railroad.

He assisted in 1895 with the design and construction of the railroad line from Guayaquil to Quito - the most difficult railroad of the world to be built at the time, that was  call "the nose of the devil", when Eloy Alfaro was president of Ecuador. 
Among his other notable contributions of architectural and engineering projects in Panama  are; the Palace of Government, the National Institute, the National Theater and Panama  city hall, the Puerto Argüelles Railroad and the plans of the Neighborhood of the Exposition that harbors among others monuments of the National Institute Gorgas.

As a member of the Liberal Party; he was elected President of the Republic of Panama by popular election, during a period of serious economic difficulties, he served as president from October 1, 1928 until January 3, 1931; its period lasted to the blow of Communal Action, his presidency focused on public works and reduction of government spending. His attempt to do so by reducing government salaries in 1928 resulted in their restoration the following year, ultimately causing a deficit in 1930. This period lasted to the blow of Communal Action until January 2, 1931 when his tenure came to an end with Dr. Arnulfo Arias Madrid led Community Actions Coup and Dr. Arnulfo Arias Madrid assuming the presidency. He died on 30 August 1945.

References

1872 births
1945 deaths
People from Panama City
Panamanian people of Spanish descent
National Liberal Party (Panama) politicians
Presidents of Panama
Heidelberg University alumni
Panamanian expatriates in Germany